Zakumi the Leopard was the official mascot for the 2010 FIFA World Cup. He was an anthropomorphized leopard with green hair, presented on September 22 2008. His name comes from "Za", the ISO 3166-1 alpha-2 code for South Africa, and kumi, a word that means "ten" in several African languages, referencing the year 2010.

Profile

Facts
Za is a code for South Africa and kumi means ten in various African languages, so it signifies South Africa 2010. The leopard's birth date coincides with a day known and celebrated as Youth Day in South Africa. The group A match played between South Africa and Uruguay (Match 17) also coincides with Zakumi's birthday. He turned sixteen on 16 June 2010.

The green and yellow (gold) colours of the character match the colours used in South African sport uniforms and can also be seen in the South Africa national football team's kit.

Andries Odendaal, from Cape Town, created the original character design. The official motto of Zakumi is "Zakumi's game is Fair Play." The motto was seen in the digital advertisement boards during the 2009 FIFA Confederations Cup, and has also appeared in the 2010 FIFA World Cup.

Personality
Zakumi was intended to depict a jolly, self-confident, adventurous, and spontaneous mascot. He was shown as loving to perform and always following his instincts and intuition. He was also shown as sometimes having the tendency to exaggerate somewhat. He was often found fooling about and teasing people, but not in a mean way. 

Zakumi was originally created by Andries Odendaal of Cape Town South Africa  and the promotional costume was produced by Cora Simpson. 

He is warm-hearted and caring, and wanted to make as many friends as possible. He loves to play football/soccer as it is a great way to connect with others and break down language barriers. He always carries his football around which he uses to invite people to play with him. It's no secret that Zakumi loves football.

At one time, he decided to dye his hair green as he felt it would be the perfect camouflage against the green of the football pitch; a bit like his rosette spots are when hunting in the wilderness! He does have one striking weakness. With all his energy, he requires frequent rests. Occasionally, between performances on stage, he may suddenly fall asleep on the spot at the most random times. But rest assured, these are only short breaks that a leopard of his calibre needs to recharge his batteries.

Life
Over the last years, he has travelled the whole of Africa where the leopard habitat is sufficient (pretty much everywhere from open savannahs, forests, jungles to mountainous areas, even deserts). He has therefore learned to adapt to new environments; enjoying the diversity in nature and people across the African continent.

Controversies
A contract for the manufacture of Zakumi figurines was awarded to a company owned by Dr. Shiaan-Bin Huang, who is an ANC representative member in the South African Parliament. The manufacture of the figurines was outsourced to Shanghai Fashion Plastic Products in China. The value of the contract was in excess of US$112 million.

Due to concerns over the loss of jobs in the South African manufacturing sector, the Congress of South African Trade Unions (COSATU) has suggested that more merchandise of 2010 be sourced locally.

The allegation of sweatshop conditions at the Shanghai Fashion Plastic Products factory led to an audit by Global Brands Group (master licensee of the brand FIFA World Cup 2010), which revealed a number of non-compliance issues with policies of GBC. The manufacturer denied the allegations of sweatshop conditions, and claimed that the working conditions at the Shanghai Fashion Plastic Products factory were "very good".

See also
FIFA World Cup mascots
Fuleco – mascot of the 2014 FIFA World Cup
2010 FIFA World Cup

References

External links

FIFA's official webpage on Zakumi
 

2010 FIFA World Cup
Fictional leopards
South African mascots
FIFA World Cup mascots
Mascots introduced in 2008